Dionysios "Sakis" Giannakopoulos (alternate spelling: Dionysis) (Greek: Διονύσης "Σάκης" Γιαννακόπουλος; born on October 24, 1982 in Kalamata, Greece) is a former Greek professional basketball player and current assistant coach for Lavrio of the Greek League, where he spent the majority of his playing career. He was a 6'4 " (1.95 m) tall  shooting guard / small forward.

Professional career
Giannakopoulos played club basketball in the Greek minors with Panelefsiniakos (2000–2001), Poseidonas Kalamatas (2001–2004), and Lavrio (2004–2010). He started his pro career with Lavrio, in the Greek 2nd Division, in the 2010–11 season. He was voted the Greek 2nd Division's MVP that same season.

With Lavrio, he played in the top-tier level Greek Basket League, for the first time, during the 2015–16 season. He was Lavrio's long-time team captain. Giannakopoulos played in over 150 games with Lavrio, and he is the record holder of the club in most games played. 

After playing 3 seasons with Lavrio in Greece's top-tier level league, he retired from playing professional basketball in 2018.

National team career
Giannakopoulos was a member of the junior national teams of Greece. With Greece's junior national team, he played at the 2000 FIBA Europe Under-18 Championship, where he won a bronze medal.

Coaching career
On August 7, 2018, Lavrio officially announced that Giannakopoulos was retiring from playing professional basketball, and joining the team's coaching staff, as an assistant coach.

References

External links
FIBA.com Profile
Eurobasket.com Profile 
Greek League Profile 

1982 births
Living people
Greek basketball coaches
Greek Basket League players
Greek men's basketball players
Lavrio B.C. players
Shooting guards
Small forwards
Sportspeople from Kalamata